Kozhukhov is a Russian masculine surname, its feminine counterpart is Kozhukhova. It may refer to
Alexandr Kozhukhov (1942–2008), Russian handball player
Mikhail Kozhukhov (born 1956), Russian journalist and television presenter

Russian-language surnames